Zia'eddin Araghi also known as Agha Zia'eddin Araghi was an eminent Shia jurist, Usuli and Mujtahid during the flourishing the Usul Fiqh in Ja'fari school in Shia after Muhammad Baqir Behbahani.

Family 
Araghi was born in 1861 in Arak, Iran. His name was Shaykh Ali but he was known as Zia Addin. His father was Mulla Muhammad Kabir Araghi and was Shia jurist and Mujtahid.

Education 
First he learned the preliminary stages in Arak and then travelled to Isfahan and resided in Sadr religious school. He participated in Isfahan in the courses of Masters like Agha Sayyed Muhammad Hashim Chahar Souqi, Mirza Jahangir Khan Qashqaei, Akhun Muhammad Kashi, and Abul Ma'ali Kalbasi. Then he Immigrated to Najaf, Iraq. Before coming to Najaf, he first had the place of judge in Samara but this occupation did not satisfy him. Among his known masters in Najaf there were Mirza Habib Rashrti, Akhund Khorasani, Sayyed Muhammad Kazim Tabatabei Yazdi, Mirza Khalil Hoseini, Shaykh Al Shariah, Sayyed Muhammad Tabatabei Fesharaki, and Mirza Ebrahim Mahallati Shirazi.

Pupils 
He also taught many eminent pupils such as following:
Sayyed Muhsin Hakim
Sayyed Muhammad Taqi Khansari
Sayyed Abul Qasem Khansari
Sayyed Mahmud Shahroudi
Sayyed Abul Qasem Khoei
The late Muhammad Taqi Bahjat
Sayyed Abdullah Shirazi
Sayyed Abdul Hadi Shirazi
Sayyed Aul Hasan Shirazi
Ayatollah Qaravi Aliyari
Shaykh Muhammad Taqi Amoli
Mirza Hashem Amoli

See also 
Mohammad-Kazem Khorasani
Iranian Constitutional Revolution 
Intellectual movements in Iran
Mirza Hussein Naini
List of Maraji
Mirza Jawad Maleki Tabrizi
Hibatuddin Shahrestani
Mohammad Hossein Esheni Qudejani

References 

Iranian writers
People of the Persian Constitutional Revolution
Iranian grand ayatollahs
Pupils of Muhammad Kadhim Khorasani
People from Arak, Iran
1861 births
Year of death missing